Dainton may refer to:

 Dainton, Devon, a settlement in Teignbridge, Devon, England
 Dainton Bank, a railway incline in Devon

People with the surname
 Bethan Dainton (born 1989), Welsh international rugby union player
 Frederick Dainton, Baron Dainton (1914–1997), British academic chemist and university administrator
 John Dainton, British physicist and professor, son of Frederick Dainton

See also
 
 Danton (disambiguation)